is a 1958 Japanese jidaigeki adventure film directed by Akira Kurosawa. It tells the story of two peasants who agree to escort a man and a woman across enemy lines in return for gold without knowing that he is a general and the woman is a princess. The film stars Toshiro Mifune as General Makabe Rokurōta and Misa Uehara as Princess Yuki while the role of the peasants, Tahei and Matashichi, are portrayed by Minoru Chiaki and Kamatari Fujiwara respectively.

The Hidden Fortress was the fourth highest-grossing film of the year in Japan, and Kurosawa's most successful film up to that point. It was a significant influence on the 1977 American film Star Wars.

Plot
Two bedraggled peasants, Tahei and Matashichi, sell their homes and leave to join the feudal Yamana clan, hoping to make their fortunes as soldiers. Instead, they are mistaken for soldiers of the defeated Akizuki clan, have their weapons confiscated, and are forced to help dig graves before being sent away without any food. After quarreling and splitting up, the two are both captured again and reunite when they are forced alongside dozens of other prisoners to dig through the ruins of the Akizuki castle for the clan's secret reserve of gold. After a prisoner uprising, Tahei and Matashichi go on the run, steal some rice, and make camp near a river.

While building a fire, they find a piece of gold marked with the crescent of the Akizuki clan. The peasants are then discovered by a mysterious man who takes them to a secret camp in the mountains. Unbeknownst to them, the man is a famous Akizuki general, Makabe Rokurōta. Although Rokurōta initially plans to kill the peasants, he changes his mind when they explain how they intend to escape Yamana territory: They will travel to Yamana itself and then pass into the neighboring state of Hayakawa through a different border. Rokurōta decides, without revealing anything to the peasants, to take Princess Yuki of the Akizuki clan to Hayakawa, whose lord has promised to protect them.

Rokurōta escorts Princess Yuki and what remains of her family's gold (hidden in hollowed-out logs of wood) to Hayakawa, with Matashichi and Tahei traveling with them. To protect Yuki, he has her pretend to be a deaf-mute and has a body double (who is Rokurōta's younger sister) sent to the Yamana to be executed so they will believe that she is dead.  During their travels, Tahei and Matashichi get the group into dangerous situations several times due to their cowardice and greed. During a stop for the night at an inn, Yuki forces Rokurōta to buy the freedom of a young prostitute, who decides to follow them.

After losing their horses and obtaining a cart to move the gold, the group is spotted by a Yamana patrol, and Rokurōta is forced to kill them. While pursuing two stragglers, he accidentally rides into a Yamana camp, where the commanding officer, Rokurōta's old rival Hyoe Tadokoro, recognizes him. 
Tadokoro states that he is sorry he didn't get to face Rokurōta in battle and challenges him to a lance duel. Rokurōta wins, but spares Tadokoro's life before stealing a horse and riding back to the group. Eventually, they are surrounded and captured by Yamana soldiers and detained at an outpost on the Hayakawa border. In the confusion, Matashichi and Tahei manage to hide. They decide to report Yuki for a reward, but the soldiers laugh at them and they leave with nothing.

Tadokoro comes to identify the prisoners the night before their execution. Tadokoro's face is now disfigured by a large scar and explains it as the result of a beating ordered by the lord of the Yamana clan as punishment for letting Rokurōta escape. Yuki proclaims that she has no fear of death and thanks Rokurōta for letting her see humanity's ugliness and beauty from a new perspective. The next day, as the soldiers start marching the prisoners to be executed, Tadokoro suddenly defects to the Akizuki side and frees Yuki, Rokurōta, and the prostitute before distracting the guards so they can ride off. The group manages to escape along with the horses carrying the gold, which wind up running in a different direction.

Matashichi and Tahei, both hungry and tired, stumble across the lost gold carried by the horses before being arrested by Hayakawa soldiers as thieves. The peasants are brought before a heavily armored samurai, who reveals that he is Rokurōta and the well-dressed noblewoman with him is Yuki. Thanking them for saving the gold (which will be used to restore her clan), the princess rewards Matashichi and Tahei with a single ryō on the condition that they share it. As the two men walk back to their village, they begin to laugh upon realizing that they have finally made their fortunes.

Cast 
Toshiro Mifune as 
Minoru Chiaki as Tahei
Kamatari Fujiwara as Matashichi
Susumu Fujita as 
Takashi Shimura as General 
Misa Uehara as Princess Yuki
Eiko Miyoshi as Yuki's lady-in-waiting
Toshiko Higuchi as a prostitute purchased by the group who chooses to accompany them
Yū Fujiki as a Yamana soldier
Sachio Sakai as a samurai
Yoshio Tsuchiya as a Yamana samurai
Kokuten Kōdō as an old villager who tells Matashichi about a reward for Yuki's capture
Kōji Mitsui as a Yamana guard overseeing the excavation of Akizuki Castle

Production
This was Kurosawa's first feature filmed in a widescreen format, Tohoscope, which he continued to use for the next decade. The Hidden Fortress was originally presented with Perspecta directional sound, which was re-created for the Criterion Blu-ray release.

Key parts of the film were shot in Hōrai Valley in Hyōgo and on the slopes of Mt. Fuji, where bad weather from the record-breaking Kanagawa typhoon delayed the production. Toho's frustration with Kurosawa's slow pace of shooting led to the director forming his own production company the following year, though he continued to distribute through Toho.

Music 

The film has musical score by Masaru Sato. The soundtrack album comprises 65 tracks.

Tracks 
 Titles
 Fallen Warrior's Death
 Peaceful Mountain Pass Road
 Yamana: Temporary Checkpoint
 War town ~ To the border
 Prisoner's loss of dignity
 Burnt Ruins of Autumn Moon Castle
 Flight
 Money!!!
 Mysterious Mountain Man 1
 Mysterious Mountain Man 2
 Good idea to go cross country
 Shining Extended Staff
 Road to the Hidden Fortress
 Woman on the Summit
 Useless Work
 Spring Woman
 Escaping Woman
 Reward Money
 Rokurota, to the Cave
 Princess Yuki's tears
 Horse and Princess
 Riding in the indicated direction
 Setting off
 Gestured Excuse
 Rokurota's Scouting
 Reliable Ally 1
 Reliable Ally 2
 Over the Black Smoke
 Bolder Trick
 Into the cheap lodgings
 Autumn Moon Woman
 Princess Yuki's Wish
 Adept on Horseback
 Spear March
 Departing Rokurota
 Party's true shape
 Daughter and Rokurota
 Sleeping Princess
 Line of Firefighters
 Surprising Rokurota (unused)
 Introduction to Firefighters
 Firefighters
 Highland Hauting
 Going Downhill
 Coming to the same conclusion
 To Hayawaka Territory
 Matashichi and Peace, In the checkpoint
 Firefighter's Song
 Execution Draws Near
 Treasonous Pardon ~ Pass Crossing
 Two Bad men in prison
 Reunion in a Castle
 Reward
 Ending
 Castle Town (ambient sounds 1)
 Castle Town (ambient sounds 2)
 Child Song
 Alternative Takes 
 Titles
 Escaping Woman
 Adept on Horseback
 Departing Rokurota (alt take 1)
 Departing Rokurota (alt take 2)
 To Hayawaka Territory
 Reunion in a Castle

Release
The Hidden Fortress was released theatrically in Japan on December 28, 1958. The film was the highest-grossing film for Toho in 1958, ranking as the fourth highest-grossing film overall in Japan that year. In box-office terms, The Hidden Fortress was Kurosawa’s most successful film, until the 1961 release of  Yojimbo.

The film was released theatrically in the United States by Toho International Col. with English subtitles. It was screened in San Francisco on November 1959 and received a wider release on October 6, 1960 with a 126-minute running time. The film was re-issued in the United States in 1962 with a 90-minute running time. The film was compared unfavorably to Rashomon (1950) and Seven Samurai (1954), and performed poorly at the U.S. box office.

Critical reception
An article published in The New York Times on January 24, 1962, had the film's review by prominent journalist Bosley Crowther who called The Hidden Fortess a superficial film. He said  
He mentioned that Kurosawa, for all his talent, is as prone to pot boiling as anyone else.

Writing for The Criterion Collection in 1987, David Ehrenstein called it  "one of the greatest action-adventure films ever made" and a "fast-paced, witty and visually stunning" samurai film. According to Ehrenstein:
The battle on the steps in Chapter 2 (anticipating the climax of Ran) is as visually overwhelming as any of the similar scenes in Griffith's Intolerance. The use of composition in depth in the fortress scene in Chapter 4 is likewise as arresting as the best of Eisenstein or David Lean. Toshiro Mifune's muscular demonstrations of heroic derring-do in the horse-charge scene (Chapter 11) and the scrupulously choreographed spear duel that follows it (Chapter 12) is in the finest tradition of Douglas Fairbanks. Overall, there’s a sense of sheer "movieness" to The Hidden Fortress that places it plainly in the ranks of such grand adventure entertainments as Gunga Din, The Thief of Baghdad, and Fritz Lang's celebrated diptych The Tiger of Eschnapur and The Hindu Tomb.

David Parkinson of the Empire on a review posted on January 1, 2000, gave the film four out of five stars and wrote "Somewhat overshadowed by the likes of Seven Samurai, this is a vigorously placed, meticulously staged adventure. It's not top drawer, but still ranks among the best of Kurosawa's minor masterpieces."

Writing for The Criterion Collection in 2001, Armond White said "The Hidden Fortress holds a place in cinema history comparable to John Ford's Stagecoach: It lays out the plot and characters of an on-the-road epic of self-discovery and heroic action. In a now-familiar fashion, Rokurōta and Princess Yuki fight their way to allied territory, accompanied by a scheming, greedy comic duo who get surprised by their own good fortune. Kurosawa always balances valor and greed, seriousness and humor, while depicting the misfortunes of war."

Upon the film's UK re-release in 2002, Jamie Russell, reviewing the film for the BBC, said it "effortlessly intertwines action, drama, and comedy", calling it "both cracking entertainment and a wonderful piece of cinema."

Peter Bradshaw of The Guardian made a review on February 1, 2002. According to him:Revered now as an inspiration for George Lucas, Kurosawa's amiable, forthright epic romance happens on a scorched, rugged landscape which looks quite a lot like an alien planet. At other times, the movie plays like nothing so much as a roistering comedy western. But it has a cleverly contrived relationship between the principals, including a fantastically brash and virile Toshiro Mifune. The comedy co-exists with a dark view of life's brevity, and Kurosawa devises exhilarating setpieces and captivating images. Arthouse classics aren't usually as welcoming and entertaining as this.

Variety called it "a long, interesting, humour-laden picture in medieval Japan". Performances of the lead actors, Kurosawa's direction and Ichio Yamazaki's camerawork were praised.

The film has an aggregate of 96% on Rotten Tomatoes based on 50 critic reviews.

Awards
The film won the Silver Bear for Best Director at the 9th Berlin International Film Festival in 1959. Kinema Junpo awarded Shinobu Hashimoto the award for Best Screenwriter for his work on the film and for Tadashi Imai's Night Drum and Yoshitaro Nomura's Harikomi.

Legacy

Influence
American director George Lucas has acknowledged the heavy influence of The Hidden Fortress on his 1977 film Star Wars, particularly in the technique of telling the story from the perspective of the film's lowliest characters, C-3PO  and R2-D2.  Almost all of the major characters from Star Wars have clear analogues in The Hidden Fortress, including C-3PO and R2-D2 being based on Tahei and Matashichi, Obi-Wan Kenobi on Rokurota Makabe, Princess Leia on Princess Yuki, and Darth Vader on Hyoe Tadokoro; the only notable major characters who were not drawn from Kurosawa's film are Luke Skywalker and Han Solo, whose character arcs were inspired by academic writer Joseph Campbell's book The Hero with a Thousand Faces, and Chewbacca, who was based on Lucas's own Alaskan Malamute dog, Indiana. Lucas's original plot outline for Star Wars bore an even greater resemblance to the plot of The Hidden Fortress (and notably lacked any characters resembling Luke or Han); this draft would subsequently be reused as the basis for The Phantom Menace. The movie is referenced in Lego Star Wars: The Skywalker Saga, where during a cutscene for the first level of Return of the Jedi, there is a flag written in Aurebesh, which translates to "Hidden Fortress".

A number of plot elements from The Hidden Fortress are used in the 2006 video game Final Fantasy XII.

Remake

A loose remake entitled Hidden Fortress: The Last Princess was directed by Shinji Higuchi and released on May 10, 2008.

References

Sources

External links

 
 
 
 The Hidden Fortress  at the Japanese Movie Database
The Hidden Fortress: Three Good Men and a Princess an essay by Catherine Russell at the Criterion Collection

1958 films
1958 adventure films
Japanese adventure films
1950s Japanese-language films
Japanese black-and-white films
Jidaigeki films
Samurai films
Toho films
Films directed by Akira Kurosawa
Films produced by Sanezumi Fujimoto
Films with screenplays by Shinobu Hashimoto
Films with screenplays by Akira Kurosawa
Films with screenplays by Hideo Oguni
Films with screenplays by Ryuzo Kikushima
Films scored by Masaru Sato
Films about princesses
1950s Japanese films